Joseph Normand Descôteaux (born January 3, 1948) is a Canadian retired professional ice hockey player who played 37 games in the World Hockey Association for the Quebec Nordiques.

External links

1948 births
Canadian ice hockey defencemen
Quebec Nordiques (WHA) players
Living people
Ice hockey people from Montreal